Hoosier Pass (elevation ) is a high mountain pass in central Colorado, in the Rocky Mountains of the western United States. The name derives from Indiana, nicknamed the "Hoosier State," which was the original home of many pioneers.

The pass is located on the Continental Divide at the northern end of the Mosquito Range, in a gap between Mount Lincoln (west) and Hoosier Ridge (east). It sits on the boundary between Park (south) and Summit (north) counties.

The pass provides a route between the headwaters of the Blue River (tributary of the Colorado River) to the north and the headwaters of the South Platte River in South Park to the south. It is traversed by State Highway 9 between the towns of Breckenridge (north) and Fairplay (south). 

The highway over the pass provides an alternative route from Denver to the ski areas near Breckenridge and Keystone. It is generally open all year round, is traversable by all vehicles in good weather, but is occasionally closed during winter storms.  The road over the pass has a smooth approach on the south side but has several switchbacks on the north side with a grade of 8%.

This pass is the highest point on the TransAmerica Trail, a transcontinental bicycle route that stretches from Yorktown, Virginia to Astoria, Oregon.

Water diversion
Hoosier Pass is the location of the oldest known transbasin diversion project in Colorado, a ditch diverting water from a tributary of the Blue River to the Middle Fork of the South Platte River.  This water was used for placer mining above Alma. By 1929, the 1.8 mile (2.9 km) East Hoosier Ditch and the 1.3 mile (2 km) West Hoosier Ditch were in operation, able to divert an aggregate 77 cubic feet per second (2.2 m3/s) of water across the continental divide.

The City of Colorado Springs obtained the water rights to these ditches and constructed the Hoosier Pass Tunnel to replace them as part of the Continental-Hoosier Diversion System.  The 10 foot (3 m) diameter 1.5 mile (2.4 km) water tunnel was completed in 1951 and delivers up to 500 cubic feet per second (14.2m3/s) to Montgomery Reservoir about a mile southwest of the pass, from which the water is piped 70 miles (113 km) to Colorado Springs.  Average annual diversions through the tunnel have been on the order of 9000 acre feet (11 million m3).

Another pass
There is another Hoosier Pass in Colorado (elevation ) located in Teller County, near Cripple Creek.

See also

 Hoosier Pass ipomopsis

References

Mountain passes of Colorado
Landforms of Park County, Colorado
Landforms of Summit County, Colorado
Great Divide of North America
Transportation in Park County, Colorado
Transportation in Summit County, Colorado